The South African diaspora consists of South African emigrants and their descendants living outside South Africa. The largest concentrations of South African emigrants are to be found in the United Kingdom, followed by Australia, the United States, New Zealand and Canada. At the time of the 2001 UK Census, some 141,405 South-African born people were present in the UK. In Australia, there were 145,683 South African-born people living in the country at the moment of the 2011 Census, having an increase compared with those 78,444 recorded by the 2001 Census. The 2000 United States Census identified 68,290 South African-born people.

According to the most recent data compiled by Statistics South Africa, between 2006 and 2016 the most popular overseas destinations for South African émigrés were: 1. Australia (26.0%), 2. United Kingdom (25.0%), 3. United States (13.4%), 4. New Zealand (9.5%), 5. Germany (6.0%), 6. American Samoa (United States territory) (4.4%), 7. United Arab Emirates (4.2%), 8. Cuba (4.0%), 9. Canada (3.0%), and 10. China (2.0%).

A number of White South Africans, most of them skilled, left the country in the years preceding and following the 1994 election that represented the end of the Apartheid era. As a result, the diaspora mainly consists of white South African emigrants of British, Jewish (mostly via Latvian, German and Lithuanian ancestry) and to a lesser extent, Afrikaner origin. A minority of  English South Africans have moved to Great Britain (often through the UK ancestry visa), due to socioeconomic concerns such as South Africa's high crime rate in the 1990s and early 2000s, a volatile South African Rand, economic mismanagement during the Jacob Zuma presidency and changes in the South African economy.

Afrikaners and Black South Africans generally have much lower emigration rates than their English and Jewish counterparts. South Africans have largely settled in the UK, Australia, New Zealand, Canada, the United States and to a lesser extent, Zimbabwe, Ireland, the UAE, Israel (mostly those of Jewish faith) and Portugal.

See also
 Zimbabwean diaspora
 South Africans in the United Kingdom

External links
 South African Expat Counselling

References